A fortress is a fortification, a defensive military construction. 

Fortress or The Fortress may also refer to:

Places 
 Fortress Pass, a pass on Baffin Island, Nunavut, Canada
 The Fortress (Alberta), a mountain in Canada
 Fortress Mountain Resort, Alberta
 The Fortress (Antarctica), a geological formation

Arts, entertainment, and media

Films
 The Fortress (1947 film), written by George Zuckerman
 Fortress (1985 film), an Australian thriller film directed by Arch Nicholson
 Fortress (1992 film), a science fiction action film starring Christopher Lambert directed by Stuart Gordon
 The Fortress (1979 film) (Az erőd), a 1979 Hungarian science fiction film
 The Fortress (1994 film) (Pevnost), a 1994 Czech film by Drahomíra Vihanová
 Fortress (2012 film), a war film directed by Michael R. Phillips
 The Fortress (2017 film) (Namhan Sansong), a 2017 South Korean film
 Fortress (2021 film), an American film starring Bruce Willis

Games
 Fortress (chess), an endgame drawing technique
 Fortress (solitaire), a solitaire or patience playing card game
 Fortress (1983 video game) for the Atari 8-bit family and Apple II
 Fortress (1984 video game) for the BBC Micro
 Fortress (2001 video game) for the Game Boy Advance
 Fortress (2011 video game), South Korean online game
 Fortress (cancelled video game), code name for a cancelled game circa 2008
 "Fortress," the English translation of the Yagura opening in shogi

Literature
 Fortress, a 1980 novel by Gabrielle Lord, on which the 1985 film was based
 The Fortress (Die Festung), a 1962 semi-autobiographical prison novel by Henry Jaeger
 The Fortress (Tvrđava), a 1970 Yugoslav novel by Meša Selimović
 The Fortress, a 1956 book by Raleigh Trevelyan
 The Fortress, a 1932 novel by Hugh Walpole
 Fortress Press, an imprint of 1517 Media

Music 
 Fortress (Alter Bridge album), 2013
 Fortress (Miniature Tigers album), 2010
 Fortress (Protest the Hero album), 2008
 Fortress (Sister Hazel album), 2000
 "Fortress" (Thee Oh Sees song), 2016
 "Fortress", a song by Bloc Party from Hymns
 "Fortress", a song by Dala from This Moment Is a Flash
 "Fortress", a song by Illenium from Ashes
 "Fortress", a song by Robert Forster from Warm Nights

Television
 "The Fortress" (Flashpoint), an episode of Flashpoint
 "The Fortress" (How I Met Your Mother), a 2013 episode of How I Met Your Mother
 "The Fortress" (Joe 90), an episode of Joe 90

Other uses
 Fortress (programming language), a Sun Microsystems language
 Fortress Investment Group, an asset management firm

See also
 
 Castle (disambiguation)
 Estadio Ciudad de Lanús – Néstor Díaz Pérez, widely known as "La Fortaleza", a multi-use stadium in Lanús, Argentina
 Fort (disambiguation)
 La Fortaleza ("The Fortress"), the official residence of the governor of Puerto Rico